Tranquillo Cremona (10 April 1837 – 10 June 1878)  was an Italian painter.

Biography

He was born in Pavia and was the brother of the mathematician Luigi Cremona. He trained as a young man with Giovanni Carnovali. Others note he trained under a painter by the name of Giacomo Trecourt from Bergamo. He moved to Venice from 1852 to 1859, where he lived alongside his brother, Giacomo Cremona, who was a lawyer. 

His first major work was a large historic canvas Marco Polo At The Court of Kubla Khan (finished 1863), followed by il Falconieri (1865), and Lovers at the tomb of Juliet. Cremona had moved to Milan, and there influenced by Carnovali, and became part of the Scapigliatura movement which was characterized by bohemian attitudes and included poets, writers, musicians and artists infused with a combination of rebellious, and later anti-academic and anarchic, tendencies. His paintings have a windswept style, lacking the linearity of Hayez and other academics and reminiscent of the Venice School and Titian.

Among Cremona's contemporaries in this movement were Giuseppe Rovani, Corrado Bozzoni, Antonio Tantardini, Giuseppe Grandi, Ferdinando Fontana, and Daniele Ranzoni. 

Cremona painted numerous portraits: Signora Torelli, Signora Desehaorps, Signora Emma Iron, Signor Sangiorgio, Vittore Grubicy, and Pisani Dossi.

and his subjects were often women. He also painted grand subjects such as and Scenes from Goethe's Faust. The brushstrokes often create dazzling figures, scintillating their margins into their surroundings. His subject's actions often remain cryptic in meaning, other than a transient observation of human encounters and behaviors. His technique recalls the pittura de tocco e di macchia (painting of touch and dots) practiced by painters such as Titian, Rembrandt, and 18th-century Northern Italian baroque masters such as Crespi, Guardi, Piazzetta, and Bazzani.  His two works are in Museo cantonale d'arte of Lugano.

His painting titled La Melodia (1874, private collection) has a woman at a piano, in an impressionist disintegration, face swaying partially away, challenging us to view the musical composition as the subject of the brushstrokes, instead of persons or dimensional objects. A work completed a few months before his death, L’edera (1878; The Ivy, referring only to a strand of the plant at one margin), one figure embraces passionately an aloof figure. The nature of the situation, perhaps even the gender of the person below, appear unsettled.

He was a friend of Scapigliatura writer Carlo Dossi. New editions of the works of the writers and poets of the Scapigliatura often feature Cremona's paintings on their covers. Cremona died in Milan, at the age of 41, of a sudden intestinal ailment, attributed to intoxication by the oil pigments which he made himself and which he usually tested by spreading them on the bare skin of his arms.

Gallery

References
 Melani, Alfredo. "Tranquillo Cremona, painter", Studio International, Volume 33, pp. 45–50.

1837 births
1878 deaths
19th-century Italian painters
Italian male painters
Italian romantic painters
Painters from Milan
Scapigliatura Movement
Deaths from digestive disease
19th-century Italian male artists